The 2018 World Figure Skating Championships were held in Milan, Italy from 19–25 March 2018, at the Mediolanum Forum.

Records 

The following new ISU best scores were set during this competition:

Qualification

Age and minimum TES requirements 
Skaters are eligible for the 2018 World Championships if they turned 15 years of age before 1 July 2017 and have met the minimum technical elements score requirements. The ISU accepts scores if they were obtained at senior-level ISU-recognized international competitions at least 21 days before the first official practice day of the championships.

Number of entries per discipline 
Based on the results of the 2017 World Championships, each ISU member nation can field one to three entries per discipline.

Schedule 

Note: times are local times (UTC+1 from March 21 through March 24 and UTC+2 on March 25).

Entries 
Member nations began announcing their selections in December 2017. The International Skating Union published the full list of entries on 28 February 2018. None of the previous year's defending champions competed.

Changes to preliminary assignments

Results

Men

Ladies

Pairs

Ice dance

Medals summary

Medalists 
Medals for overall placement:

Small medals for placement in the short segment:

Small medals for placement in the free segment:

By country 
Table of medals for overall placement:

Table of small medals for placement in the short segment:

Table of small medals for placement in the free segment:

References

Citations

External links 
 Official ISU results page

World Championships
2018 in Italian sport
2018 Figure Skating World Championships
World Championships,2018
March 2018 sports events in Italy
Sports competitions in Milan
2018